Music Box Films is a distributor of foreign and independent film in theatrical, DVD/Blu-ray, and video-on-demand markets in the United States. Based in Chicago, Music Box Films is independently owned and operated by the Southport Music Box Corporation, which also owns and operates the Music Box Theatre.

Founded in 2007, the company's first releases were Tuya's Marriage, OSS 117: Cairo, Nest of Spies, and Tell No One, the latter of which became a notable foreign-language film success in the United States, grossing over $6,000,000 and becoming the highest-grossing foreign film in the US in 2008.

Past releases include the film adaptations of Stieg Larsson’s trilogy of novels. Other releases include 2015 Academy Award winner for Best Foreign Language Film Ida, 2016's A Man Called Ove, the Emily Dickinson biopic A Quiet Passion starring Cynthia Nixon, and Christian Petzold’s film Transit.

Releases

References

External links 
 Official site
 Internet Movie Database

2007 establishments in Illinois
American companies established in 2007
Companies based in Chicago
Film distributors of the United States